This is a list of yearly Ohio Valley Conference football standings.

Ohio Valley standings

References

Ohio Valley Conference
Standings